Anon Amornlerdsak (born November 6, 1997) is a Thai professional footballer who plays for Thai League 1 club Bangkok United and the Thailand national team Anon grew up in the Lisu tribe in Mae Rim District, Chiangmai.

Personal life 
Anon is one of the rare Christians in the Thai national team.

International career
In 2020, He played the 2020 AFC U-23 Championship with Thailand U23.

International goals

U23

under-19

Honours

Club
Buriram United
 Thai League 1 (2): 2015, 2017
 Thai FA Cup (1): 2015
 Toyota Premier Cup (1): 2016
 Mekong Club Championship (2): 2015, 2016

International
Thailand U-19
 AFF U-19 Youth Championship (1): 2015

References

External links
 
 

Living people
1997 births
Anon Amornlerdsak
Anon Amornlerdsak
Lisu people
Anon Amornlerdsak
Association football wingers
Anon Amornlerdsak
Anon Amornlerdsak
Anon Amornlerdsak
Anon Amornlerdsak
Anon Amornlerdsak
Anon Amornlerdsak
Competitors at the 2019 Southeast Asian Games
Anon Amornlerdsak